Gymnoscelis ammocyma is a moth in the family Geometridae. It is found in Yemen.

References

Moths described in 1958
Gymnoscelis